Seven Beauties ("Pasqualino Sevenbeauties") is a 1975 Italian language film written and directed by Lina Wertmüller and starring Giancarlo Giannini, Fernando Rey, and Shirley Stoler.

Written by Wertmüller, the film is about an Italian everyman who deserts the army during World War II, is captured by the Germans and sent to a prison camp, where he does anything he can to survive. Through flashbacks, we learn about his seven unattractive sisters, his accidental murder of one sister's lover, his imprisonment in an insane asylum—where he rapes a patient—and his volunteering to be a soldier to escape confinement.

For her work on the film, Wertmüller became the first woman nominated for the Academy Award for Best Director. The film received three other Academy Award nominations, including one for Best Foreign Language Film. It also received a Golden Globe Award nomination for Best Foreign Film.

The production design and costume design are by Wertmüller's husband, Enrico Job.

Plot
The picaresque story follows its protagonist, Pasqualino (Giannini), a dandy and small-time hood in Naples in Fascist and World War II-era Italy.

To defend his family's honor, Pasqualino kills a pimp who had turned his sister into a prostitute. To dispose of the victim's body, he dismembers it and places the parts in suitcases. Caught by the police, he confesses to the murder, but successfully pleads insanity and is sentenced to 12 years in a psychiatric ward. Desperate to get out, he volunteers for the Italian Army. With an Italian comrade, he eventually deserts the army, but they are captured and sent to a German concentration camp.

Pasqualino attempts to survive the camp by providing sexual favors to the female commandant (Stoler). His plan succeeds, but the commandant puts Pasqualino in charge of his barracks as a kapo. He is told he must select six men from his barracks to be killed to prevent all from being killed. Pasqualino ends up executing his former Army comrade, and is responsible for the death of another fellow prisoner, a Spanish anarchist.

At the war's end, upon his return to Naples, Pasqualino discovers that his seven sisters, his fiancée, and even his mother have all survived by becoming prostitutes. Unfazed, he insists on marrying his fiancée as soon as possible.

Cast
 Giancarlo Giannini as Pasqualino Frafuso, a.k.a. Settebellezze
 Fernando Rey as Pedro, the anarchist prisoner
 Shirley Stoler as the prison camp commandant
 Elena Fiore as Concettina, a sister
 Piero Di Iorio as Francesco, Pasqualino's comrade
 Enzo Vitale as Don Raffaele
 Roberto Herlitzka as socialist
 Lucio Amelio as lawyer
 Ermelinda De Felice as Pasqualino's mother
 Bianca D'Origlia as the psychiatrist
 Francesca Marciano as Carolina
 Mario Conti as Totonno "18 Carati", Concettina's pimp

Production

Casting
Giannini starred in three other films Wertmüller made during this period: The Seduction of Mimi (1972), Love and Anarchy (1973), and Swept Away (1974).

Filming locations
Seven Beauties was filmed on location in Naples, Campania, Italy.

Opening sequence
In the opening sequence of Seven Beauties, spoken over World War II archival footage showing the destruction of cities and men, Wertmüller defines the object of her critique—a "particular petty bourgeois social type".

Critical response
The film's subject is survival. At the time of its release, it was controversial for its graphic depiction of Nazi concentration camps. In his 1976 essay "Surviving", Bruno Bettelheim, while admiring the film's artistry, severely criticized its depiction of the experience of concentration camp survivors. Bettelheim's own views about concentration camps have likewise been critiqued.

On Rotten Tomatoes, the film has an approval rating of 68% based reviews from 19 critics. In April 2019, a restored version of the film was selected to be shown in the Cannes Classics section at the 2019 Cannes Film Festival.

Awards and nominations

See also
 List of submissions to the 49th Academy Awards for Best Foreign Language Film
 List of Italian submissions for the Academy Award for Best Foreign Language Film
 List of Italian films of 1975
 The Seven Beauties: A medieval Iranian romance poem about the foreign escapades of the pre-Islamic Persian ruler, Bayram Gur. Framed in pleasantries in seven pavilions modeled on seven climes controlled by the seven planets followed by various sufferings, grievances and injustices encountered in seven of his subjects.

References
Notes

Citations

Bibliography

External links
 
 
 

1975 films
1975 comedy-drama films
Italian comedy-drama films
1970s Italian-language films
Italian World War II films
Holocaust films
Films directed by Lina Wertmüller
Films set in psychiatric hospitals
Survival films
1970s Italian films